The Cool Death of Island Raiders is the fifth studio album by the American garage rock band Thee Oh Sees, released on March 7, 2006, on Narnack Records. Co-produced by TV on the Radio members Dave Sitek and Kyp Malone, the album was released under the names, The Ohsees and The Oh Sees, and is the first studio album to feature backing vocalist and future keyboardist Brigid Dawson.

The album features mostly freak folk songs, alongside experimental drone compositions.

Reception
Upon the album's release, Pitchfork's Cory D. Byrom gave it a mostly negative review, writing: "Dwyer's work here is a mess. He relies too heavily on the freak half of freak folk, burying the songs in grating arrangements and murky production."

Track listing

Personnel

The Oh Sees
John Dwyer - vocals, guitar, electronics
Brigid Dawson - backing vocals, tea and biscuits
Patrick Mullins - drums, electronics, shakers, singing saw

Additional musicians
Dave Sitek - piano, electric piano, organ
Kyp Malone - guitar, backing vocals
Darren Gardner - violin, slowed-down violin
Martin Perna - saxophone

Recording personnel
Dave Sitek - producer
Kyp Malone - producer
Chris Moore - producer
Betty Edwards - producer
Brooke Hamre Gilles - producer

References

2006 albums
Oh Sees albums